Benny Schnoor (28 December 1922 – 5 September 2003) was a Danish cyclist. He competed in the team pursuit event at the 1948 Summer Olympics.

References

External links
 

1922 births
2003 deaths
Danish male cyclists
Olympic cyclists of Denmark
Cyclists at the 1948 Summer Olympics
Sportspeople from the Capital Region of Denmark